The 1984–85 UCLA Bruins men's basketball team represented the University of California, Los Angeles.  The Bruins received their first invitation to the National Invitation Tournament (NIT)  in school history. The team went  and defeated the Indiana Hoosiers in the final; Reggie Miller was named the tournament's most valuable player.

Walt Hazzard began his first season as head coach of UCLA after replacing Larry Farmer. The team included a core of seniors in center Brad Wright, power forward Gary Maloncon, and point guard Nigel Miguel. Miguel was a defensive stopper, and assigned to the opponents' best scorer. He was the only Bruin named to the all-conference team in the Pacific-10, and he was also the Pac-10 Defensive Player of the Year.

Starting lineup

Roster

Schedule

|-
!colspan=9 style=|Regular Season

|-
!colspan=12 style="background:#;"| NIT

Source:

Awards and honors
Reggie Miller, Most Outstanding Player, NIT

Team players drafted into the NBA

Notes
 The Bruins finished tied for 3rd in the Pacific-10.
 The team played in 4 OT games, 2 double-OT and 1 4-OT vs. USC.
 Cross town USC managed to pull a rare sweep of UCLA, the first since the 1941–42 season.

References

UCLA Bruins men's basketball seasons
Ucla
National Invitation Tournament championship seasons
Ucla
NCAA
NCAA